Polypoetes forficata is a moth of the family Notodontidae. It is found in eastern Ecuador.

The ground color of the forewings is dark brown to blackish brown, but lighter in the basal third. The central area of the hindwings is immaculate white, with scattered dark brown scales near the base.

The larvae feed on Psammisia species.

Etymology
The name is from the Latin word for scissors shaped (masculine, forficatus) and refers to the strongly bifid uncus of the male genitalia in this taxon, a trait that distinguishes it from most other Polypoetes species.

References

Moths described in 2008
Notodontidae of South America